Santa Fe de la Vera Cruz (usually called just Santa Fe) is the capital city of the province of Santa Fe, Argentina. It is situated in north-eastern Argentina, near the junction of the Paraná and Salado rivers. The city is also connected by canal with the port of Colastiné on the Paraná River. The metropolitan area has a population of 653,073, making it the eighth largest in Argentina. The third largest city in Argentina is Rosario, also located in Santa Fe Province.

Santa Fe de la Vera Cruz is linked to Rosario ( to the south), the largest city in the province, by the Brigadier Estanislao López Highway and by National Route 11, which continues south towards Buenos Aires. Córdoba is about ( west of Santa Fe,  through the National Route 19. Santa Fe is home to the Sauce Viejo Airport with daily direct flights to Rosario and Aeroparque Jorge Newbery in Buenos Aires.

History

Santa Fe de la Vera Cruz was founded in the nearby site of Cayastá in 1573, by the Captain Juan de Garay, who came from Asunción, at the time. The site is today a historical park containing the grave of Hernandarias, the first American-born governor in South America.  The settlement was moved to the present site in 1653 due to the constant flooding of the Cayastá River. The city became the provincial capital in 1814, when the territory of the province of Santa Fe was separated from the province of Buenos Aires by the National Constituent Assembly, held in the city in 1853.

Santa Fe de la Vera Cruz is the commercial and transportation center for a rich agricultural area that produces grain, vegetable oils, and meats. The city is the site of the National Technological University – Santa Fe Regional Faculty, Catholic University of Santa Fe (inaugurated in 1959), and the National University of the Littoral (first founded as the Provincial University in 1889, and which changed to its current name in 1919).

A suspension bridge was completed in 1924, though severe flooding partially destroyed it in 1983 (a second bridge, the Oroño, was opened in 1971). The city's location is still not immune to flooding, however. On  April 29, 2003, the Salado, which empties into the Paraná near Santa Fe, rose almost 2 m (6.5 ft) in a few hours following heavy rainfall, and caused a catastrophic flood. No fewer than 100,000 people had to be evacuated, and large sections of the city remained under water more than a week later. That year, the suspension bridge was reopened, and in 2008, the city's historic grain silos were converted into the Los Silos Hotel and Casino, and San Martín Street was converted to pedestrian use.

The city's historical role in the Argentine Constitution led national lawmakers to choose it as the site of Constitutional Conventions in 1949, 1957, and 1994.

Climate 
The city has a climate considered as humid subtropical (Cfa, according to the Köppen climate classification, with a Cwa tendency). Winters are generally mild, though minimum temperatures can fall below  on cold nights during the winter. Summers are generally hot and humid. During the most extreme heat waves, temperatures have exceeded . Temperatures have exceeded  in every season.

Rainfall can be expected throughout the year though summer is usually the wettest season. Thunderstorms can be intense with frequent lightning, powerful downdraughts and intense precipitation.

The city

Santa Fe has a lot of important commercial centres, busy cultural life, interesting options in sports and tourism, numerous artistic and musical events, and an exciting nightlife.

There is important infrastructure for tourism that has been developed: river side bars and nightclubs, chic restaurants, the improvement of the major highways and a subfluvial tunnel and, combine that with the beauty of the landscape and the various attractions that tourists enjoy make this a popular region to spend holidays. Hunting, fishing, excursions, walks by the river, practising water sports on the River Paraná  (18 km away via Nº168 National Road), visiting the Space Observation Centre or the Zoo- Experimental Station of "La Esmeralda" Farm, make the tourist feel amazed and eager to know more about the region.

In a nutshell, Santa Fe offers a complete and varied shade of attractions that make one dive into history when visiting monuments, museums or find oneself in the beautiful parks, rivers and streams surrounded by wild flora and fauna.

Transport

Railway
Despite having had four railway stations, nowadays the city Santa Fe is not served by rail transport. The Mitre Railway station is no longer used since 2007, when defunct company Trenes de Buenos Aires cancelled its services to Santa Fe. Likewise, the Santa Fe Belgrano (built in 1891 and named Cultural Heritage) and Guadalupe stations had been entered into disuse in 1993 when the railway privatisation in Argentina ceased all the long-distance services in the country.

In the 2010s, the local municipality remodelled both stations as Guadalupe would be terminus for a new urban train. Nevertheless, the original project was not carried out. On the other hand, the Santa Fe Belgrano station was re-opened as a convention center.

The fourth station (also the oldest of all) had been built by French company Province of Santa Fe Railway in 1885. It was demolished in 1962 and replaced by a bus station.

Railway stations in the city of Santa Fe are:

Notes:
 1 No longer active since TBA cancelled its services.
 2 Granted in concession to the Municipality of Santa Fe that remodelled it completely. The station re-opened as a convention center.
 3 Refurbished in 2011 by the Municipality to be terminus of an urban train. Nevertheless, the project was not carried out. 4 Also known as "La Francesa", it was demolished in 1962 to build a bus station.''

Sports
Santa Fe put itself on the international sports map as one of the host cities of the 1990 FIBA World Championship. The games were played in the Estadio de la Facultad Regional Santa Fe. The city is also home to two first division football teams: Club Atlético Colón and Club Atlético Unión, who contest the Santa Fe derby. Santa Fe was also the place where the world known Amílcar Brusa was born and raised, and the home of boxers Carlos Baldomir and Julio César Vásquez.

Notable natives

 Estanislao López, past Governor
 Carlos Thompson, actor
 Diego Bustos, journalist
 Norman Briski, actor and director
 Marcos Mundstock, actor and humorist
 Ariel Ramírez, musician and composer
 Ricardo Supisiche, artist
 Reine Flachot, cellist
 Liliana Bodoc, writer
 Osvaldo Bayer, writer
 Sergio Rubin, journalist
 Francisco Urondo, poet, writer and playwright
 Fernando Birri, film maker
 Carlos Baldomir, boxer
 Julio César Vásquez, boxer
 Carlos Delfino, basketball player
 Tayavek Gallizzi, basketball player
 Carlos Guastavino, pianist, composer
 Luciano De Cecco, volleyball player
 Victoria Mayer, volleyball player
 Germán Chiaraviglio, pole vaulter
 Arturo Kenny, polo player
 Rubén Rézola, sprint canoeist
 Santiago Grassi, swimmer
 Amelia Fournel, sport shooter
 Mario Schujovitzky, football player
 Enrique García, football player
 René Pontoni, football player
 Leopoldo Luque, football player
 Pedro Pablo Pasculli, football player
 Sebastián Battaglia, football player
 Juan Antonio Pizzi, football player, manager
 Carlos Reutemann, formula one driver and governor
 Alberto Armando, businessman and football manager
 Jorge Faurie, Diplomat, Minister of Foreign Affairs
 Rogelio Pfirter, Diplomat

Gallery

Sister cities

Santa Fe is twinned with:

 Santa Fe Springs, United States (1960)
 Ypacaraí, Paraguay (1978)
 Cuneo, Italy
 Montevideo, Uruguay

See also

Paraná River steamers
Argentine Littoral

References

External links

 

 
Populated places in Santa Fe Province
Capitals of Argentine provinces
Paraná River
Port settlements in Argentina
Populated places established in 1573
Cities in Argentina
1573 establishments in the Spanish Empire
Argentina
Santa Fe Province